The 4th Academy Awards were held on November 10, 1931 by the Academy of Motion Picture Arts and Sciences, awarding films released between August 1, 1930, and July 31, 1931. Cimarron was the first Western to win Best Picture, and would remain the only to do so for 59 years. It received a then-record seven nominations, and was the first film to win more than two awards; it and A Free Soul were the first films to receive multiple acting nominations.

Nine-year-old Jackie Cooper was the first child actor to receive a nomination, and was the youngest nominee for nearly 50 years. He remains the second-youngest Oscar nominee of all time, and the only Best Actor nominee under age 18. At the ceremony, he fell asleep on the shoulder of Best Actress nominee Marie Dressler; when Dressler was announced as the winner, Cooper had to be eased onto his mother's lap.

Best Actor winner Lionel Barrymore became the first person to have received nominations in multiple categories, having been nominated for Best Director for Madame X at the 2nd Academy Awards, as well as the only Best Actor winner born in the 1870s.

Winners and nominees 

Nominees were announced on October 5, 1931. Winners are listed first and highlighted in boldface.

Multiple nominations and awards 

The following seven films received multiple nominations:

 7 nominations: Cimarron
 4 nominations: Skippy and Morocco
 3 nominations: The Front Page and A Free Soul
 2 nominations: Holiday and Svengali

The following one film received multiple awards:

 3 awards: Cimarron

See also 

 1930 in film
 1931 in film

References

Academy Awards ceremonies
1930 film awards
1931 film awards
1931 in American cinema
1931 in Los Angeles
November 1931 events